This is a list of law enforcement agencies in the state of Minnesota.

According to the US Bureau of Justice Statistics' 2008 Census of State and Local Law Enforcement Agencies, the state had 448 law enforcement agencies employing 9,667 sworn police officers, about 185 for each 100,000 residents.

State agencies 

Minnesota Department of Corrections
Minnesota Department of Natural Resources
Law Enforcement Division
Minnesota Department of Public Safety
Minnesota Bureau of Criminal Apprehension
Minnesota State Fire Marshal
Minnesota Alcohol Gambling Enforcement Division
Minnesota State Patrol
Capitol Security
Minnesota Department of Commerce
Fraud Bureau
Minnesota National Guard
Dept. of Military Affairs Security Police
Military Police
34th Military Police Company
257th Military Police Company
Security Forces
148th Security Forces Squadron
133rd Security Forces Squadron
Phoenix Raven Team

County agencies 

 Aitkin County Sheriff's Office
 Anoka County Sheriff's Office
 Becker County Sheriff's Office
 Beltrami County Sheriff's Office
 Benton County Sheriff's Office
 Big Stone County Sheriff's Office
 Blue Earth County Sheriff's Office
 Brown County Sheriff's Office
 Carlton County Sheriff's Office
 Carver County Sheriff's Office
 Cass County Sheriff's Office
 Chippewa County Sheriff's Office
 Chisago County Sheriff's Office
 Clay County Sheriff's Office
 Clearwater County Sheriff's Office
 Cook County Sheriff's Office
 Cottonwood County Sheriff's Office
 Crow Wing County Sheriff's Office
 Dakota County Sheriff's Office
 Dodge County Sheriff's Office
 Douglas County Sheriff's Office
 Faribault County Sheriff's Office
 Fillmore County Sheriff's Office
 Freeborn County Sheriff's Office
 Goodhue County Sheriff's Office
 Grant County Sheriff's Office
 Hennepin County Sheriff's Office
 Houston County Sheriff's Office
 Hubbard County Sheriff's Office

 Isanti County Sheriff's Office
 Itasca County Sheriff's Office
 Jackson County Sheriff's Office
 Kanabec County Sheriff's Office
 Kandiyohi County Sheriff's Office
 Kittson County Sheriff's Office
 Koochiching County Sheriff's Office
 Lac Qui Parle County Sheriff's Office
 Lake County Sheriff's Office
 Lake of the Woods County Sheriff's Office
 Le Sueur County Sheriff's Office
 Lincoln County Sheriff's Office
 Lyon County Sheriff's Office
 Mahnomen County Sheriff's Office
 Marshall County Sheriff's Office
 Martin County Sheriff's Office
 McLeod County Sheriff's Office
 Meeker County Sheriff's Office
 Mille Lacs County Sheriff's Office
 Morrison County Sheriff's Office
 Mower County Sheriff's Office
 Murray County Sheriff's Office
 Nicollet County Sheriff's Office
 Nobles County Sheriff's Office
 Norman County Sheriff's Office
 Olmsted County Sheriff's Office
 Otter Tail County Sheriff's Office
 Pennington County Sheriff's Office
 Pine County Sheriff's Office

 Pipestone County Sheriff's Office
 Polk County Sheriff's Office
 Pope County Sheriff's Office
 Ramsey County Sheriff's Office
 Red Lake County Sheriff's Office
 Redwood County Sheriff's Office
 Renville County Sheriff's Office
 Rice County Sheriff's Office
 Rock County Sheriff's Office
 Roseau County Sheriff's Office
 Saint Louis County Sheriff's Office
 Scott County Sheriff's Office
 Sherburne County Sheriff's Office
 Sibley County Sheriff's Office
 Stearns County Sheriff's Office
 Steele County Sheriff's Office
 Stevens County Sheriff's Office
 Swift County Sheriff's Office
 Todd County Sheriff's Office
 Traverse County Sheriff's Office
 Wabasha County Sheriff's Office
 Wadena County Sheriff's Office
 Waseca County Sheriff's Office
 Washington County Sheriff's Office
 Watonwan County Sheriff's Office
 Wilkin County Sheriff's Office
 Winona County Sheriff's Office
 Wright County Sheriff's Office
Yellow Medicine County Sheriff's Office

City agencies 

 Ada Police Department
 Adrian Police Department
 Aitkin Police Department
 Akeley Police Department
 Albany Police Department
 Albert Lea Police Department
 Alexandria Police Department
 Annandale Police Department
 Anoka Police Department
 Apple Valley Police Department
 Appleton Police Department
 Arlington-Green Isle Police Department
 Atwater Police Department
 Austin Police Department
 Avon Police Department
 Babbitt Police Department
 Bagley Police Department
 Barnesville Police Department
 Battle Lake Police Department
 Baudette Police Department
 Baxter Police Department
 Bayport Police Department
 Becker Police Department
 Belgrade Police Department
 Belle Plaine Police Department
 Bemidji Police Department
 Benson Police Department
 Big Lake Police Department
 Bird Island Police Department
 Biwabik Police Department
 Blaine Police Department
 Blooming Prairie Police Department
 Bloomington Police Department
 Blue Earth Police Department
 Bovey Police Department
 Boyd Police Department
 Braham Police Department
 Brainerd Police Department
 Breckenridge Police Department
 Breezy Point Police Department
 Brooklyn Center Police Department
 Brooklyn Park Police Department
 Brownton Police Department
 Buffalo Police Department
 Buffalo Lake Police Department
 Buhl Police Department
 Burnsville Police Department
 Caledonia Police Department
 Cambridge Police Department
 Canby Police Department
 Cannon Falls Police Department
 Callaway Police Department
 Champlin Police Department
 Chaska Police Department
 Chatfield Police Department
 Chisago City Police Department
 Chisholm Police Department
 Circle Pines Police Department
 Clara City Police Department
 Clarkfield Police Department
 Clearbrook Police Department
 Cloquet Police Department
 Cold Spring Richmond Police Department
 Coleraine Police Department
 Columbia Heights Police Department
 Coon Rapids Police Department
 Corcoran Police Department
 Cottage Grove Police Department
 Crookston Police Department
 Crosby Police Department
 Crosslake Police Department
 Crystal Police Department
 Cuyuna Police Department
 Dawson Police Department
 Deephaven Police Department
 Deer River Police Department
 Deerwood Police Department
 Detroit Lakes Police Department
 Dilworth Police Department
 Duluth Police Department
 Dundas Police Department
 Eagan Police Department
 Eagle Lake Police Department
 East Grand Forks Police Department
 Echo Police Department
 Eden Prairie Police Department
 Edina Police Department
 Elbow Lake Police Department
 Elk River Police Department
 Elko New Market Police Department
 Ely Police Department
 Emily Police Department
 Eveleth Police Department
 Fairmont Police Department
 Faribault Police Department
 Farmington Police Department
 Fergus Falls Police Department

 Fisher Police Department
 Foley Police Department
 Forest Lake Police Department
 Fosston Police Department
 Frazee Police Department
Fridley Police Department
 Fulda Police Department
 Gaylord Police Department
 Gibbon Police Department
 Gilbert Police Department
 Glencoe Police Department
 Glenwood Police Department
 Goodhue Police Department
 Goodview Police Department
 Grand Marais Police Department
 Grand Rapids Police Department
 Granite Falls Police Department
 Hackensack Police Department
 Hallock Police Department
 Hancock Police Department
 Hastings Police Department
 Hawley Police Department
 Hector Police Department
 Henderson Police Department
 Hendricks Police Department
 Henning Police Department
 Hermantown Police Department
 Hibbing Police Department
 Hill City Police Department
 Hokah Police Department
 Hopkins Police Department
 Houston Police Department
 Howard Lake Police Department
 Hoyt Lakes Police Department
 Hutchinson Police Department
 International Falls Police Department
 Inver Grove Heights Police Department
 Isle Police Department
 Ivanhoe Police Department
 Jackson Police Department
 Janesville Police Department
 Jordan Police Department
 Kasson Police Department
 Keewatin Police Department
 La Crescent Police Department
 Lake Benton Police Department
 Lake City Police Department
 Lake Park Police Department
 Lake Crystal Police Department
 Lakefield Police Department
 Lakeville Police Department
 Lamberton Police Department
 Le Center Police Department
 Le Sueur Police Department
 Lester Prairie Police Department
 Lewiston Police Department
 Lindstrom Police Department
 Lino Lakes Police Department
 Litchfield Police Department
 Little Falls Police Department
 Long Prairie Police Department
 Lonsdale Police Department 
 Madelia Police Department 
 Madison Police Department 
 Madison Lake Police Department
 Maple Grove Police Department
 Mapleton Police Department
 Maplewood Police Department
 Medina Police Department
 Melrose Police Department
 Menahga Police Department
 Mendota Heights Police Department
 Milaca Police Department
 Mille Lacs Band Police Department
 Minneapolis Police Department
 Minneota Police Department
 Minnetonka Police Department
 Minnetrista Police Department
 Montevideo Police Department
 Montgomery Police Department
 Moorhead Police Department
 Moose Lake Police Department
 Mora Police Department
 Morgan Police Department
 Morris Police Department
 Mound Police Department
 Mounds View Police Department
 Mountain Lake Police Department
 Nashwauk Police Department
 Nett Lake Police Department
 New Brighton Police Department
 New Hope Police Department
 New Prague Police Department
 New Richland Police Department
 New Ulm Police Department
 New York Mills Police Department
 Newport Police Department

 North Branch Police Department
 North Mankato Police Department
 North St Paul Police Department
 Northfield Police Department
 Oakdale Police Department
 Olivia Police Department
 Ortonville Police Department
 Osakis Police Department
 Osseo Police Department
 Owatonna Police Department
 Park Rapids Police Department
 Parkers Prairie Police Department
 Paynesville Police Department
 Pelican Rapids Police Department
 Pequot Lake Police Department
 Perham Police Department
 Pierz Police Department
 Pine River Police Department
 Plainview Police Department
 Plymouth Police Department
 Preston Police Department
 Princeton Police Department
 Prior Lake Police Department
 Proctor Police Department
 Ramsey Police Department
 Red Wing Police Department
 Redwood Falls Police Department
 Renville Police Department
 Richfield Police Department
 Robbinsdale Police Department
 Rochester Police Department
 Rogers Police Department
 Roseau Police Department
 Rosemount Police Department
 Roseville Police Department
 Rushford Police Department
 Sartell Police Department
 Sauk Centre Police Department
 Sauk Rapids Police Department
 Savage Police Department
 Sebeka Police Department
 Shakopee Police Department
 Sherburn Police Department
 Silver Bay Police Department
 Silver Lake Police Department
 Slayton Police Department
 Sleepy Eye Police Department
 South Lake Minnetonka Police Department
 Spring Grove Police Department
 Spring Lake Park Police Department
 Springfield Police Department
 St. Anthony Police Department
 St. Charles Police Department
 St. Cloud Police Department
 St. Francis Police Department
 St. James Police Department
 St. Joseph Police Department
 St. Louis Park Police Department
 St. Paul Police Department
 St. Paul Park Police Department
 Staples Police Department
 Starbuck Police Department
 Stewart Police Department
 Stillwater Police Department
 Thief River Falls Police Department
 Tracy Police Department
 Truman Police Department
 Twin Valley Police Department
 Two Harbors Police Department
 Tyler Police Department
 Virginia Police Department
 Wabasha Police Department
 Wadena Police Department
 Waite Park Police Department
 Walker Police Department
 Warren Police Department
 Warroad Police Department
 Waseca Police Department
 Waterville Police Department
 Watkins Police Department
 Wayzata Police Department
 Wells Police Department
 West Concord Police Department
 West St Paul Police Department
 Westbrook Police Department
 Wheaton Police Department
 White Bear Lake Police Department
 Willmar Police Department
 Windom Police Department
 Winnebago Police Department
 Winona Police Department
 Winsted Police Department
 Winthrop Police Department
 Woodbury Police Department
 Worthington Police Department
 Wyoming Police Department
 Zumbrota Police Department

Township agencies 

 Breitung Police Department

Other agencies 

 Leech Lake Tribal Police Department
 Lower Sioux Tribal Police Department
 Prairie Island Tribal Police Department
 Red Lake Tribal Police Department
 White Earth Tribal Police Department
 Metropolitan Transit Police Department
 Minneapolis Park Police Department
 Minneapolis St. Paul International Airport Police Department
 Office of the United States Marshal for the District of Minnesota
 Three Rivers Park District Police Department
 University of Minnesota Police Department
 University of Minnesota Duluth Police Department
 Upper Sioux Community Police Department
 Federal Bureau of Prisons
 United States Federal Reserve Police
 United States Department of Veterans Affairs Police
 United States Federal Protective Service Police
 Federal Bureau of Investigation
 Department of Defense Police

References

Minnesota
Law enforcement agencies of Minnesota
Law enforcement agencies